Aaron Michael Thomas Maund (born September 19, 1990) is an American soccer player who most recently played for Charlotte Independence in the USL Championship.

Career

Youth and college

Maund played four years at The Roxbury Latin School in Boston, Massachusetts and four years with the Notre Dame Fighting Irish, starting 77 matches in his college career.

Professional

Maund was selected 12th overall by Toronto FC in the first round of the 2012 MLS SuperDraft. On March 17, 2012 Maund made his debut for Toronto as a first half sub for Torsten Frings in a 3–1 away defeat to Seattle Sounders FC. On December 3, 2012, Maund was traded to Real Salt Lake in exchange for Justin Braun.

On August 9, 2017, Maund was traded to Vancouver Whitecaps FC in exchange for a third-round pick in the 2018 MLS SuperDraft. Maund was released by Vancouver at the end of their 2018 season.

Maund was on-trial at D.C. United prior to the beginning of the 2020 MLS season.

International

Maund represented the United States at the FIFA Under-20 World Cup in 2009. Two years prior, Maund played for Trinidad & Tobago in the FIFA Under-17 World Cup.

Honors

Toronto FC
Canadian Championship: 2012

Real Salt Lake
Major League Soccer Western Conference Championship: 2013

References

External links
 
 Notre Dame Fighting Irish profile

1990 births
Living people
American soccer players
American sportspeople of Trinidad and Tobago descent
American expatriate sportspeople in Canada
American expatriate soccer players
Trinidad and Tobago footballers
Trinidad and Tobago expatriate footballers
Notre Dame Fighting Irish men's soccer players
Indiana Invaders players
Toronto FC players
Real Salt Lake players
San Antonio Scorpions players
Real Monarchs players
Vancouver Whitecaps FC players
Charlotte Independence players
Soccer players from Boston
Expatriate soccer players in Canada
Toronto FC draft picks
USL League Two players
Major League Soccer players
North American Soccer League players
USL Championship players
United States men's under-20 international soccer players
Roxbury Latin School alumni
2009 CONCACAF U-20 Championship players
Association football defenders
People from Dorchester, Massachusetts